Melitracen (brand names Melixeran) is a tricyclic antidepressant (TCA), for the treatment of depression and anxiety. In addition to single drug preparations, it is also available as Deanxit, marketed by Lundbeck, a combination product containing both melitracen and flupentixol.

The pharmacology of melitracen has not been properly investigated and is largely unknown, but it is likely to act in a similar manner to other TCAs. Indeed, melitracen is reported to have imipramine and amitriptyline-like effects and efficacy against depression and anxiety, though with improved tolerability and a somewhat faster onset of action.

See also
 Fluotracen
 Litracen
 Dimetacrine

References

Dimethylamino compounds
Anthracenes
Tricyclic antidepressants